Sulut is a village and municipality in the Ismailli Rayon of Azerbaijan.  It has a population of 886.  The municipality consists of the villages of Sulut, Kələzeyvə, and Sərsurə.

References 

Populated places in Ismayilli District